Simone Kaljob is a footballer from Cameroon and has played for the Cameroon national team.

Kaljob, a midfielder, joined Torquay United on trial on July 13, 2000. He had previously been playing in Austria and had played twice for the Cameroon national side. The following day he appeared as a substitute in the friendly away to Dartington and later played in the friendlies against Portsmouth and Millbrook. However he did not impress Torquay manager Wes Saunders enough to warrant a contract and was released before the end of July.

References

Living people
Cameroonian footballers
Association footballers not categorized by position
Year of birth missing (living people)